Emporium is a borough and the county seat of Cameron County in the U.S. state of Pennsylvania. Early in the twentieth century, there were large power plants and manufacturers of radio tubes and incandescent lamps (Sylvania Electric Products), paving brick, flour, iron, lumber, and sole leather. In 1900, 2,463 people lived in Emporium, and in 1910, the population was 2,916. By 2010 the population had dropped to 2,073, and at the 2020 census, the population was 1,961.

Geography
Emporium is located in northern Cameron County at  (41.511288, -78.236418). It is in the valley of the Driftwood Branch of Sinnemahoning Creek, flowing southeast towards the West Branch Susquehanna River. Pennsylvania Route 120 passes through the borough, leading southeast  to Driftwood and eventually Lock Haven and Williamsport, and west  to St. Marys on the Eastern Continental Divide. Pennsylvania Route 46 leads northwest from Emporium  to Smethport, and Pennsylvania Route 155 leads north  to Port Allegany, both of which communities are in the Allegheny River basin.

Demographics

As of the census of 2010, there were 2,073 people, 956 households, and 498 families residing in the borough. The population density was 2,961.4 people per square mile (1,156.8/km²). There were 1,140 housing units at an average density of 1,628.6 per square mile (636.2/km²). The racial makeup of the borough was 98.1% White, 0.5% African American, 0.4% Native American, 0.4% Asian, and 0.6% from two or more races. Hispanic or Latino of any race were 0.6% of the population.

There were 956 households, out of which 25.7% had children under the age of 18 living with them, 34.9% were married couples living together, 11.8% had a female householder with no husband present, and 47.9% were non-families. 42.4% of all households were made up of individuals, and 19.6% had someone living alone who was 65 years of age or older. The average household size was 2.09 and the average family size was 2.87.

In the borough the population was spread out, with 21.8% under the age of 18, 57.4% from 18 to 64, and 20.8% who were 65 years of age or older. The median age was 44 years.

The median income for a household in the borough was $32,468, and the median income for a family was $46,544. Males had a median income of $32,473 versus $29,489 for females. The per capita income for the borough was $18,713. About 10.7% of families and 16.3% of the population were below the poverty line, including 27.7% of those under age 18 and 11.9% of those age 65 or over.

Notable people 
 Joseph T. McNarney, World War I flying ace, four-star general, Deputy Chief of Staff of the U.S. Army during World War II, Supreme Allied Commander of the Mediterranean Theater, a Military Governor of the U.S. Occupation Zone in Germany. He was appointed Knight Commander of the Order of the Bath by King George VI of the United Kingdom.
Nate Sestina (born 1997), basketball player in the Israeli Basketball Premier League

Gallery

References

Further reading
A History of Cameron County, Pennsylvania. (1991). Dallas, Texas: Curtis Media Corp.

External links

County seats in Pennsylvania
Populated places established in 1810
Boroughs in Cameron County, Pennsylvania
1864 establishments in Pennsylvania